Lleyton Hewitt defeated David Nalbandian in the final, 6–1, 6–3, 6–2 to win the gentlemen's singles tennis title at the 2002 Wimbledon Championships. It was his second major title, after winning the 2001 US Open. Hewitt became the first Australian to win the title since Pat Cash in 1987.

Goran Ivanišević was the defending champion, but withdrew due to a shoulder surgery and he would not return until 2004. When Hewitt next played at Wimbledon, as defending champion in 2003, he lost in the first round.

The tournament was notable for the poor results of the top players. With the exception of Hewitt and world No. 4 Tim Henman, the top 17 seeds were eliminated before the fourth round. This granted relatively unknown players an unusually high chance of success, especially as Hewitt and Henman were in the same half of the draw and played each other in the semifinals.

In one of the biggest upsets in Wimbledon history, seven-time champion Pete Sampras was eliminated by George Bastl in the second round, in what would be Sampras' last appearance at Wimbledon. The 1992 champion Andre Agassi suffered a second-round defeat to unseeded Paradorn Srichaphan, while future eight-time champion Roger Federer was defeated in the first round by qualifier Mario Ančić, his last defeat at Wimbledon before his record-tying five straight Wimbledon-titles between 2003 and 2007.

This was the last major for 1997 finalist and former world No. 4 Cédric Pioline, losing in the first round to Marat Safin, and the last appearance for 1996 champion Richard Krajicek, reaching the quarterfinals before losing to Xavier Malisse.

Seeds

  Lleyton Hewitt (champion)
  Marat Safin (second round)
  Andre Agassi (second round)
  Tim Henman (semifinals)
  Yevgeny Kafelnikov (third round)
  Pete Sampras (second round)
  Roger Federer (first round)
  Thomas Johansson (first round)
  Juan Carlos Ferrero (second round)
  Guillermo Cañas (second round)
  Andy Roddick (third round)
  Jiří Novák (second round)
  Younes El Aynaoui (first round)
  Thomas Enqvist (second round)
  Andrei Pavel (third round)
  Nicolas Escudé (third round)

  Rainer Schüttler (third round)
  Sjeng Schalken (quarterfinals)
  Juan Ignacio Chela (first round)
  Tommy Robredo (first round)
  Max Mirnyi (first round)
  Nicolás Lapentti (quarterfinals)
  Greg Rusedski (fourth round)
  Gastón Gaudio (second round)
  Fabrice Santoro (second round)
  Todd Martin (second round)
  Xavier Malisse (semifinals)
  David Nalbandian (final)
  James Blake (second round)
  Ivan Ljubičić (second round)
  Stefan Koubek (second round)
  Jarkko Nieminen (second round)

The original #5 seed Tommy Haas withdrew due to personal reasons before the tournament draw was made. All original seeds from 6-32 moved up one place, and a new #32 seed was added.

Qualifying

Draw

Finals

Top half

Section 1

Section 2

Section 3

Section 4

Bottom half

Section 5

Section 6

Section 7

Section 8

References

External links

 2002 Wimbledon Championships – Men's draws and results at the International Tennis Federation

Men's Singles
Wimbledon Championship by year – Men's singles